is a mountain located on the Kunisaki Peninsula in Ōita Prefecture, Kyūshū, Japan.

References

Mountains of Ōita Prefecture